Tynita Butts (born June 10, 1990) is an American athlete competing in high jump. She competed at the collegiate level at East Carolina University.

Representing the United States at the 2019 World Athletics Championships, she placed eight in the women's high jump.

She has qualified to represent the United States at the 2020 Summer Olympics.

References

American female high jumpers
1990 births
Living people
World Athletics Championships athletes for the United States
Sportspeople from Hampton, Virginia
East Carolina Pirates athletes
Athletes (track and field) at the 2020 Summer Olympics
Olympic track and field athletes of the United States
21st-century American women
20th-century American women